Fausto is a given name and surname. It is used as a title for:


Music
 Fausto (opera), an opera by Louise Bertin

Films
 Fausto (1993 film), a French film directed by Rémy Duchemin
 Fausto (2018 film), a Canadian film directed by Andrea Bussmann

People with the given name
 Fausto (footballer, born 1985), or Fausto José Tomás Lúcio, Portuguese footballer
 Fausto Bordalo Dias (born 1948), Portuguese musician 
 Fausto Amodei (born 1935), Italian singer-songwriter
 Fausto Bertinotti (born 1940), Italian politician
 Fausto Budicin (born 1981), Croatian footballer
 Fausto Cercignani (born 1941), Italian scholar, essayist and poet
 Fausto Cigliano (born 1937), Italian singer, guitarist and occasional actor
 Fausto Cleva (1902–1971), Italian-born American operatic conductor
 Fausto Carmona (born 1980), Dominican baseball player
 Fausto Coppi (1919–1960), Italian racing cyclist
 Fausto Correia (1951–2007), Portuguese politician
 Fausto De Amicis (born 1968), Australian football player
 Fausto Elhuyar (1755–1833), Spanish chemist
 Fausto Fernós (born 1972), Puerto Rican podcaster, performance artist, and drag performer
 Fausto Ferrari (born 1980), Italian footballer
 Fausto Frigerio (born 1966), Italian hurdler and long jumper
 Fausto Gresini (born 1961), Italian motorcycle racer
 Fausto Leali (born 1944), Italian singer
 Fausto Mata (born 1971), Dominican comedian and actor
 Fausto Papetti (1923–1999), Italian saxophone player
 Fausto Pari (born 1962), Italian footballer
 Fausto Pinto (born 1983), Mexican footballer
 Fausto Pocar (born 1939), Italian jurist
 Fausto Poli (1581–1653), Italian Catholic priest
 Fausto Paolo Sozzini (1539–1604), Italian theologian
 Fausto Quinde (born 1976), Ecuadorian race walker
 Fausto Ricci (born 1961), Italian motorcycle racer
 Fausto Romitelli (1963–2004), Italian composer
 Fausto Rossi (singer-songwriter) (born 1954), Italian singer-songwriter
 Fausto Rossi (footballer) (born 1990), Italian footballer
 Fausto Saraceni (1920–2000), Italian film producer
 Fausto dos Santos (1905–1939), Brazilian footballer
 Fausto Silva (born 1950), Brazilian television presenter
 Fausto Sucena Rasga Filho (1929-2007), Brazilian basketball player
 Fausto Tienza (born 1990), Spanish footballer
 Fausto Veranzio (1551–1617), Croatian polymath and bishop
 Fausto Zonaro (1854–1929), Italian painter

People with the surname
 Boris Fausto (born 1930), Brazilian historian
 Vettor Fausto (1490–1546), Venetian humanist and naval architect

See also
Di Fausto
 Hurricane Fausto
 Faust (disambiguation)
 Faustus (disambiguation)

Italian masculine given names
Spanish masculine given names
Portuguese masculine given names